The Grand Slam in NASCAR is the achievement of winning all of the NASCAR Cup Series majors in a calendar year.

The Grand Slam
In 1984, R. J. Reynolds Tobacco Company announced at the Waldorf Astoria New York during the annual year end awards banquet two new events that would define NASCAR for years to come. The first was an invitation only, "all-star" exhibition race called The Winston (now known as the NASCAR All-Star Race). The other announcement was that they were formally elevating the sport's four majors (sometimes referred to as the "crown jewels") into a formal Grand Slam with a cash prize bonus, known as the Winston Million. The long established and recognized major events were as follows:

Daytona 500 (known as the richest race on the circuit) – held in February at Daytona International Speedway
Winston 500 (known as the fastest race) – held in late April or early May at Talladega Superspeedway
Coca-Cola 600 (known as the longest race) – held Memorial Day weekend at Charlotte Motor Speedway
Southern 500 (known as the oldest superspeedway race)  – held Labor Day weekend at Darlington Raceway
The Southern 500 was moved to November in 2004, then eliminated by the Ferko settlement in 2005. Winners of the 500-mile spring races at Darlington from 2005 to 2008 were retroactively named winners of the Southern 500. The Southern 500 name returned in 2009, and the race returned to Labor Day weekend in 2015. The Rebel 400 returned in 2020 due to scheduling changes related to the COVID–19 pandemic, and the “throwback weekend” moved from the Southern 500 to the Rebel 400 in 2021.
The Brickyard 400, which began in 1994, has often been referred to as either a fifth major or as the fourth major in place of Talladega.
The Winston 500, now the GEICO 500, at Talladega has usually been considered the major, but the Fall race at the track has sometimes been recognized as such.

Prior to 1985, no driver had ever won all four races in the same season. Only once had a driver claimed a "Small Slam", winning three out of the four races: David Pearson in 1976. LeeRoy Yarbrough won Daytona, Charlotte, and Darlington in 1969, although it was considered a "Triple Crown" at the time as the Talladega event was not established until 1970.

Winston Million
From 1985 to 1997, R. J. Reynolds and brand sponsor Winston offered a 1 million bonus to any driver who won three out of the four races (a "Small Slam") in a single calendar year season. If there was no million-dollar winner, a $100,000 consolation bonus would be given to the first driver to win two of the four races.

If a driver went into the Coca-Cola 600 or the Southern 500 with a chance to win the million, the race was advertised as the "Winston Million Running of the Coca-Cola 600" or the "Winston Million Running of the Southern 500". From 1994 to 1996, the program was advertised as the "Winston Select Million", as R. J. Reynolds elected to promote Winston's "Select" brand of cigarettes.

Initial success
In the Winston Million program's first year (1985), Bill Elliott captured the million-dollar bonus, and the victory thrust him into superstardom. He dominated the season-opening Daytona 500, then won the Winston 500 at an all-time NASCAR record speed. He remarkably came back from two laps down, having lost the laps due to having to pit due to a broken oil fitting, and he subsequently made the laps up under green. After suffering mechanical problems at Charlotte, Elliott captured the million dollar bonus at Darlington, taking command after Cale Yarborough lost power steering.

Elliott became known as "Million Dollar Bill" and appeared on the September 9, 1985 cover of Sports Illustrated.

Frustration
The relative ease with which Elliott had won the Winston Million led many to believe that the bonus would be awarded fairly often in subsequent seasons. This would ultimately prove untrue, as the award was difficult to win, and at times, it was difficult to even have a driver in contention to win.

In 1989, Darrell Waltrip became the first driver since Elliott to have a chance at the Million, after he won at Daytona and Charlotte. He was never a factor at Darlington, though, hitting the notorious Turn 4 (now Turn 2) wall during the Southern 500 (a race he had not won in his career at the time). Waltrip settled for the $100,000 consolation prize.
In 1990, Dale Earnhardt was leading the Daytona 500 on the final lap when he cut a tire and failed to win the race. He went on to win at Talladega and Darlington, meaning that he would have claimed the bonus had he held on to win at Daytona.
In 1992, rain cut the Southern 500 short, robbing Davey Allison of a chance to clinch both the Million and the Career Grand Slam. He had been in contention much of the race, but finished fifth after a late pit stop shuffle. That race ended on fuel strategy as Waltrip stayed out on the track and was leading when rain stopped the race on lap 293. With the win, Waltrip finished off a Career Grand Slam.
In 1996, Dale Jarrett had a chance to win the Million. He won at Daytona and Charlotte, and had finished just 0.22 seconds shy of winning at Talladega (coming in second to Sterling Marlin), but hit the wall early in the notoriously narrow Turn 3 at Darlington, which led to a 14th-place finish.

Final running
It would not be until 1997, the program's final year of existence, that the Million was won again. Jeff Gordon won the season-opening Daytona 500, but finished fifth in the Winston 500. He had to win the Coca-Cola 600 to keep his Winston Million opportunity alive, which he did. Gordon clinched the Winston Million by winning the Southern 500, holding off a hard-charging Jeff Burton on the final lap. The two cars touched coming around Turn 4 to take the white flag side-by-side, with Gordon holding on to win his third of four consecutive Southern 500 wins, a record in NASCAR majors. A Brinks truck led him around the victory lap, spewing bags of Winston play money.

Winston Million race winners/results (1985–1997)

Winston No Bull 5
In 1998, in preparations for the 50th anniversary of NASCAR, R. J. Reynolds decided to revamp and reintroduce the million dollar award program. Several factors contributed to the change. After thirteen seasons, the Winston Million had been won only twice, and several times, no driver won even two events. R. J. Reynolds, along with NASCAR, the drivers, and fans, wanted a new format for the award, which allowed it to be won more often and have more drivers involved.

The four established crown jewels on the circuit were experiencing worthy competition. In 1994, the inaugural Brickyard 400 at the Indianapolis Motor Speedway was held, and for several years, actually dethroned the Daytona 500 as the richest race of the season. The events at Richmond International Raceway were also fast becoming fan and driver favorites. In addition, several new venues were introduced to the schedule, all of which were offering large base purses.

The new program for 1998, titled the No Bull 5 (after a Winston marketing campaign) consisted of three legs of the original Grand Slam (Daytona 500, Coca-Cola 600, Southern 500) along with the Brickyard 400. The race at Talladega used for the program, however, was switched from the spring race to the October race. As a result, that event changed sponsorship names and became referred to as the Winston 500. The rules were as follows:

The drivers who finished in the top 5 of a No Bull 5 race qualified themselves for the bonus at the next No Bull 5 race.
If one of those five drivers went on to win that next No Bull 5 race, he won a $1 million bonus.
Five fans were chosen for each No Bull 5 race, and were paired with each of the five qualified drivers. If the driver won the bonus, the lucky fan paired with him also won $1 million.

During the No Bull 5 races, the No Bull 5 eligible drivers raced with special paint jobs. The number on the roof and the rear spoiler was painted day-glow orange because many cars were painted red, and a day-glow "$" was affixed to the passenger window along with a red dot on the windshield in races prior to 2001. Other special decals were sometimes present. This allowed fans to quickly identify and follow the progress of the five eligible drivers. The only exception was the 1998 Daytona 500 where eligible drivers had silver numbers instead of the orange.

In subsequent seasons, the races chosen for the No Bull 5 program varied. The Brickyard 400 was dropped after only one year, replaced by the Las Vegas 400. Eventually the Daytona 500 was replaced with the Pepsi 400, and the Southern 500 was replaced by the fall event at Richmond.

In its five-year span, which totalled twenty-five races, 125 eligible driver spots, and 124 eligible fans (one fan qualified twice, winning neither), the million dollar bonus was won thirteen times. Jeff Gordon won it a record four times. Including his 1997 Winston Million victory, Gordon won a total of $5 million from the bonus program.

Winston No Bull 5 winners/results
The top five finishers in each race listed qualified to race for the bonus in the next No-Bull 5 race. For the first No-Bull 5 race, the 1998 Daytona 500, the top five finishers from the 1997 DieHard 500 were used.

1998
Daytona 500 (Daytona) – no winner (Dale Earnhardt wins Career Grand Slam)
Coca-Cola 600 (Charlotte) – no winner
Brickyard 400 (Indianapolis) – Jeff Gordon
Pepsi Southern 500 (Darlington) – Jeff Gordon (fourth consecutive win; most consecutive wins in a Grand Slam event)
Winston 500 (Talladega) – Dale Jarrett

1999
Daytona 500 (Daytona) – Jeff Gordon
Las Vegas 400 (Las Vegas) – no winner
Coca-Cola 600 (Charlotte) – Jeff Burton
The 50th Pepsi Southern 500 (Darlington) – Jeff Burton
Winston 500 (Talladega) – no winner

2000
Daytona 500 (Daytona) – Dale Jarrett
CarsDirect.com 400 (Las Vegas) – Jeff Burton
Coca-Cola 600 (Charlotte) – no winner
Chevrolet Monte Carlo 400 (Richmond) – no winner
Winston 500 (Talladega) – Dale Earnhardt (76th and final win)

2001
UAW-DaimlerChrysler 400 (Las Vegas) – Jeff Gordon
Mike Skinner, who finished sixth at the 2000 Winston 500, participated in No Bull 5 promotion following Dale Earnhardt's death in the Daytona 500.
Coca-Cola 600 (Charlotte) – no winner
Pepsi 400 (Daytona) – no winner
Chevrolet Monte Carlo 400 (Richmond) – no winner
EA Sports 500 (Talladega) – Dale Earnhardt Jr.

2002
UAW-DaimlerChrysler 400 (Las Vegas) – no winner
Coca-Cola Racing Family 600 (Charlotte) – Mark Martin
Pepsi 400 (Daytona) – no winner
Chevrolet Monte Carlo 400 (Richmond) – no winner
EA Sports 500 (Talladega) – Dale Earnhardt Jr.

Career Grand Slam statistics
From 1998–2004, after the Winston Million program was discontinued, no driver managed to win three of the four majors in the same season. For 2004, NASCAR announced the new Chase format and moved Darlington's major to November. As a result of the Ferko lawsuit, it was discontinued outright in 2005, much to the dismay of fans and competitors. The 500-mile race was moved to the spring and the 400-mile spring race was discontinued. Scheduling issues as a result of the COVID-19 pandemic led to Darlington regaining its second race, the Rebel 400, in 2020; this change was made permanent in 2021.

Winners of the 500-mile spring races at Darlington from 2005 to 2008 were retroactively named winners of the Southern 500. The Southern 500 name returned in 2009, and the race returned to Labor Day weekend in 2015, becoming a “NASCAR throwback weekend”. The throwback weekend was moved from the Southern 500 to the Rebel 400 in 2021.

The Brickyard 400 at the Indianapolis Motor Speedway, which began in 1994, has been considered by fans and competitors to be one of NASCAR’s majors. However, the transition to the Indianapolis Road Course in 2021 ended the traditional Brickyard 400.

Career Grand Slam Champions

Note: Gordon, Earnhardt, Johnson, and Harvick each won the Brickyard 400 to complete a Grand Slam +1. Gordon won the event five times, Johnson four times, and Harvick three times.

Brickyard 400 or the Rebel 400 as a Major?
After the Ferko lawsuit originally brought an end to the fourth major, fans have consistently discussed the possibility of elevating either the Rebel 400 (first run in 1957 as a Convertible Division race, and became a NASCAR Cup race in 1960, although was restricted to convertibles until 1962, and first run with hardtops in 1963) or the Brickyard 400 (first run in 1994) as new "majors". However, the 500-mile races at Darlington from 2005 to 2008 were retroactively named a continuation of the Southern 500, before the original Southern 500 name returned in 2009 and the original race weekend (Labor Day) returned in 2015. Additionally, the traditional Brickyard 400 was discontinued in 2021 in favor of running on the Indianapolis Road Course.

In recent years, the Talladega race has also been questioned as a major, though the original concept from R. J. Reynolds Tobacco for the 1985 season established the four majors based on richest, fastest, longest, and oldest. It has also been disputed as to whether the spring or fall Talladega race is the true major, but the spring race has traditionally held the major status.

Four career Grand Slam winners (Jeff Gordon, Dale Earnhardt, Jimmie Johnson, and Kevin Harvick) have completed a career grand slam with the addition of the Brickyard 400, for a Grand Slam +1, with Gordon, Johnson, and Harvick also having won a Southern 500 each while the race was run in the spring. Additionally, Gordon, Earnhardt, and Johnson won the Rebel 400 before its original discontinuance after 2004, and Harvick won the first race when it was revived in 2020. Of the top five all-time NASCAR Cup race winners, only two (Gordon and Darrell Waltrip) have started a Brickyard 400. Official "major" status has never been granted to this race, but it is widely recognized as being a major, usually in place of or alongside Talladega.

When Kevin Harvick won the 2011 Coca-Cola 600, he completed his run of winning all three majors (Daytona 2007, Talladega 2010, Charlotte 2011), but he made four Darlington fall starts (2001–2004), so his Career Triple Crown status was originally questionable. He also won the Brickyard 400 in 2003, 2019, and 2020, and the last edition of the spring Southern 500 in 2014. These victories allowed Harvick to become the fourth driver to complete the Grand Slam +1. In 2020, Harvick won two of the three Darlington dates, with wins in the return of the Rebel 400 (The Real Heroes 400) in May and the Southern 500 in September.

More recently, there have been suggestion that the Bristol Motor Speedway's night race, one of NASCAR's most popular short track races, should be considered a "crown jewel" race instead of either aforementioned races.

Crown Jewel Race history
NASCAR Crown Jewel races are defined as the four majors which constituted the Winston Million bonus, along with the Brickyard 400, which has been considered by many to be a Crown Jewel event since its inception in 1994. The status of the Brickyard 400 as a major has been disputed, but NASCAR recognizes the event as a Crown Jewel race. Jeff Gordon has the most career Crown Jewel wins at 21, followed by Jimmie Johnson with 14 and Bobby Allison with 13. None of Allison's wins included the Brickyard 400, as he was retired by its inception.

1950–1980
The first running of the Southern 500 at Darlington Raceway in 1950 was the first NASCAR race on a large speedway. It has become known as NASCAR's "oldest superspeedway race". The Talladega event was originally known as the Alabama 500 in 1970, becoming the Winston 500 from 1971 to 1997. It has been scheduled in April or May since its inception. With the addition of this race, it became possible to win all four majors in a season to complete a Grand Slam, although that feat has never been accomplished. The Daytona 500 and Coca-Cola 600 have held relatively constant dates since their inaugural race, with the Daytona 500 always held in February and the Coca-Cola 600 always scheduled for Memorial Day weekend.

1981–2003
The Brickyard 400 event was established in 1994, held in early August during the time between the Coca-Cola 600 and the Southern 500. With the addition of Indianapolis, it became possible to achieve a Grand Slam +1 if a driver was able to win the four original majors and the Brickyard 400. Dale Earnhardt was the first to accomplish this feat, having won all five events by 1998, followed by Jeff Gordon in 2000, Jimmie Johnson in 2006, and Kevin Harvick in 2014. No driver has won four or five of the events in a single season.

2004–2020
The Southern 500 was moved to November for 2004, then to Mother's Day weekend in May from 2005 to 2013, held on Saturday night. It was held in April in 2014 and moved back to Labor Day weekend in 2015. The Brickyard 400 was moved up a week to late July in 2007 and moved to the weekend after the Southern 500 in September for 2018 and 2019. It then moved to Independence Day weekend in 2020, in place of the Coke Zero 400, which was held the week before the Southern 500.

2021–present
In 2021, the Brickyard 400 was dropped in favor of the Verizon 200 at the Brickyard at the Indianapolis road course, with the date being moved back to August. The status of the race as a Crown Jewel was then dropped. By 2023, only five 500-mile races remained on the schedule: Daytona 500, Coca-Cola 600, Southern 500, and both Talladega races.

Television

 Daytona 500: ABC (1962–1978), CBS (1979–2000), Fox (2001, 2003, 2005, 2007–present), NBC (2002, 2004, 2006)
 Winston 500: ESPN/ABC (1970–1972, 1981–1982, 1986–2000), CBS (1975–1977), MRN TV (1979–1980), NBC (1983–1985), Fox (2001–present)
 Coca-Cola 600: ABC (1970), CBS (1975–1981), Mizlou (1982–1984), Jefferson-Pilot (1985–1987), TBS (1988–2000), Fox (2001–present)
 Southern 500: ABC (1962, 1965–1967, 1969–1973, 1975–1983), ESPN (1984–2000), TNT (2001–2002), NBC/NBCSN (2003–2004, 2015–present), Fox (2005–2014)
 Brickyard 400: ABC (1994–2000), NBC/NBCSN (2001–2006, 2015–2020), ESPN (2007–2014)

Sprint Summer Showdown
In 2011 at New Hampshire Motor Speedway, Sprint announced a Summer program running from Indianapolis to Bristol, and the winner would be run at Atlanta for any driver who wins those races. The finalists would have a fan choose a driver (Like the No Bull 5 Program) and together the driver, fan, and Drivers choice of Charity would each receive a Million (In Brad Keselowski's case as he won at Pocono and Bristol, the fan would have to split the difference). None of the drivers running for the Showdown won. The highest running driver was Keselowski who finished 6th. Other recipients included Kyle Busch, Marcos Ambrose, and Paul Menard the later of the two, both won their first career wins in the Program.

Xfinity Series Dash 4 Cash Program

A similar program to the No Bull 5 occurs in the Xfinity Series, which began in 2009 under the series' Nationwide Insurance sponsorship. At a race prior to the first race in the program will be designated the top four finishers for the first race in the bonus.  Those drivers in the first race in the program are eligible for a $100,000 bonus. Fans will select one of those four drivers, and a lucky fan will also win $100,000. The highest championship driver (as of 2011) finisher in the race, eligible for points in the Xfinity race, wins the bonus and automatically qualify's for the next event. The next three highest finishers eligible for points in the series also get a chance to race for the bonus at the next Dash4Cash race.

Starting in 2015, the 30th anniversary of the million dollar cash bonus, Comcast (the new sponsor of the second-tier series), announced modifications to the five-race program, including a million dollar bonus. Unlike past years where the races were typically assigned to conflicting weekends to prevent Sprint Cup drivers from participating under pre-2011 rules, the four races are Dover, the Lilly Diabetes 250 (Indianapolis), Food City 250 (Bristol), and Darlington.  As usual, the top four finishers at Charlotte participate in the program starting at Dover.

The rules are the same, but Xfinity drivers will have a chance to qualify for the Dash 4 Cash at Charlotte. After that, that next four races are Dover, Indianapolis, Bristol, and Darlington. If a driver wins the first three cash prizes, and then wins outright Darlington, the driver's winnings in the bonus program will be augmented to one million dollars.  The driver must claim the Dover, Indianapolis, and Bristol bonuses, finish first overall in the Darlington race, and earn the 47 (or 48 if the driver leads the most laps) points for the win at Darlington to claim the $600,000 bonus.

See also
Marlboro Million

References

 NASCAR's majors help define careers -  David Newton, 31 July 2011

NASCAR trophies and awards
Awards established in 1985
NASCAR Cup Series
1985 establishments in the United States